The Duck Mountain Provincial Forest is located on the Saskatchewan / Manitoba border. The forest sits atop the Duck Mountains, which rise 200-500m above the surrounding prairie, and are part of the larger Manitoba Escarpment.

Both Manitoba's Duck Mountain Provincial Park and Saskatchewan's Duck Mountain Provincial Park are contained within the forest. The majority of the forest is located in Manitoba's Census Division No. 20, but substantial portions of the forest lie in the rural municipalities of Ethelbert, Roblin, Grandview, Swan Valley West, Minitonas – Bowsman, and Mountain, and in Saskatchewan's rural municipalities of Cote and St. Phillips. 

The forest is designated as a provincial forest on both sides of the border. The Manitoba portion of the forest has an area of 3,770 km² (1,455 sq mi), which includes all of the park's area of 1,424 km² (550 sq mi). The forest was established in 1906. It is the largest Provincial Forest in Manitoba, slightly larger than the next largest Swan-Pelican Provincial Forest.

See also
Provincial forests (Manitoba)
List of Saskatchewan provincial forests

References

External links
Manitoba's Provincial Forests: Manitoba Conservation Department

Forests of Manitoba
Duck Mountain Provincial Park (Manitoba)